Magda Miller (born Magdalena Ekaterina Antonina Vishinski Klastaites, in 1934) is a Scottish actress.

Born in Strathblane, Stirlingshire, she is of Scottish, Russian and Lithuanian descent.

She appeared in a number of films in the 1950s, notably in the mystery film Town on Trial, before turning towards acting in various TV series and programmes such as Maigret, Dixon of Dock Green, Tottering Towers, Public Eye and The Tripods, until the 1980s.

Selected filmography

References

External links

1934 births
Living people
Scottish film actresses
Scottish television actresses
Scottish people of Russian descent
Scottish people of Lithuanian descent